is the drummer for the Japanese band The Mad Capsule Markets. Motokatsu replaced former Berrie drummer Seto on the band's first release, "Government Wall". He also plays in a side-project called Rally, with members of GLAY and Thee Michelle Gun Elephant. They first appeared with a cover song for the Buck-Tick tribute album, Parade -Respective Tracks of Buck-Tick-.

See also
The Mad Capsule Markets
Schaft

References

1969 births
Living people
Japanese rock drummers
Japanese punk rock musicians
The Mad Capsule Markets members
Musicians from Tokyo